Events from the year 1764 in Russia

Incumbents
 Monarch – Catherine II

Events

 Foundation of the Smolny Institute.

Births

Deaths

 
 
 
 
 July 16 – Tsar Ivan VI of Russia (murdered in prison) (b. 1740)

References

1764 in Russia
Years of the 18th century in the Russian Empire